Rose City is a city three miles east of Beaumont in Orange County, Texas, United States. The population was 502 at the 2010 census, down from 519 at the 2000 census. It is part of the Beaumont–Port Arthur Metropolitan Statistical Area.

Geography

Rose City is located at  (30.105080, –94.055689).

Climate

The climate in this area is characterized by hot, humid summers and generally mild to cool winters.  According to the Köppen Climate Classification system, Rose City has a humid subtropical climate, abbreviated "Cfa" on climate maps.

History
In 1950, an oilfield called Rose Hill was discovered just south of the town plat which yielded large quantities of crude oil and gas.
The oil field along with sand and gravel pits would provide revenue for the area. In 1973, the town's voters elected to incorporate.

Demographics

As of the census of 2000, there were 519 people, 190 households, and 126 families residing in the city. The population density was 301.3 people per square mile (116.5/km). There were 215 housing units at an average density of 124.8 per square mile (48.3/km). The racial makeup of the city was 91.52% White, 0.58% Native American, 1.16% Asian, 4.43% from other races, and 2.31% from two or more races. Hispanic or Latino of any race were 10.40% of the population.

There were 190 households, out of which 31.6% had children under the age of 18 living with them, 51.6% were married couples living together, 8.4% had a female householder with no husband present, and 33.2% were non-families. Of all households 23.7% were made up of individuals, and 8.9% had someone living alone who was 65 years of age or older. The average household size was 2.73 and the average family size was 3.32.

In the city, the population was spread out, with 29.3% under the age of 18, 11.6% from 18 to 24, 28.5% from 25 to 44, 19.5% from 45 to 64, and 11.2% who were 65 years of age or older. The median age was 31 years. For every 100 females, there were 101.9 males. For every 100 females age 18 and over, there were 100.5 males.

The median income for a household in the city was $27,344, and the median income for a family was $31,429. Males had a median income of $31,923 versus $16,591 for females. The per capita income for the city was $12,143. About 14.6% of families and 15.1% of the population were below the poverty line, including 17.4% of those under age 18 and 12.5% of those age 65 or over.

Education
Public education in Rose City is provided by the Vidor Independent School District.

References

Cities in Orange County, Texas
Cities in Texas
Hurricane Ike
Cities in the Beaumont–Port Arthur metropolitan area